European Travel Information and Authorisation System (ETIAS) is a planned electronic authorisation system of the European Union for visa-exempt visitors travelling to the European Union or the Schengen Area (including EFTA countries), with the exception of the Republic of Ireland, which is a member of the Common Travel Area.

It will be similar to other electronic travel authorisations, such as ESTA in the United States, as well as the systems implemented by Australia, Canada and New Zealand and planned by the United Kingdom.

ETIAS travel authorisation will be required for travel to the Schengen Area as well as Bulgaria, Cyprus, and Romania. Ireland is the only EU member state that continues to have its own visa policy and does not plan to join the Schengen Area or to require ETIAS.

The implementation of ETIAS has been postponed several times. As of 2023, it is expected to become operational in 2024, with a 6-month grace period to allow eligible travellers and staff to become familiar with the new system, and to catch possible technical problems.

History 
The idea of the an electronic travel authorisation system was first proposed by the European Commission in 2016. ETIAS was formally established by Regulation (EU) 2018/1240 of the European Parliament and of the Council of 12 September 2018.

Applicable nationalities 

ETIAS will be required from nationals of visa-exempt third countries (Annex II) except the European microstates of Andorra, Monaco, San Marino and Vatican City. It will also be required from family members of EU or Schengen nationals not holding a residence card indicating that status. However, ETIAS will not be required from family members holding such a card; from holders of visas, residence permits, local border traffic permits or refugee or stateless travel documents issued by an EU or Schengen country; from crew members; from holders of diplomatic or official passports; or from airport transit passengers. Visitors who have dual nationality of an EU or Schengen country and of a visa-exempt country (for example, Italy and Canada) will not need ETIAS if they use a travel document from the EU or Schengen country.

, holders of ordinary passports of the following countries and territories, without a travel document from an EU or Schengen country, would match the ETIAS criteria:

Applying for ETIAS 

Prospective visitors will need to complete an online application and a €7 fee will be required from those between ages 18 and 70. The system is expected to process the vast majority of applications automatically by searching in electronic databases and providing an immediate response, but in some limited cases it may take up to 30 days. If approved, the authorisation will be valid for three years or until the expiry date of the travel document, whichever is earlier.

See also 
 Visa policy of the Schengen Area
 Entry/Exit System
 Electronic System for Travel Authorization (United States)
 Electronic Travel Authority (Australia)
 Electronic Travel Authorization (Canada)
 New Zealand Electronic Travel Authority
 UK electronic travel authorisation

Notes

References

External links 

 European Travel Information and Authorisation System (ETIAS) official website

Visa policy by country
Visa policies in Europe
Schengen Area
Expedited border crossing schemes